Wang Chuanyao (March, 1931 - November 19, 2007) was a male table tennis player from China. From 1956 to 1961 he won several medals in singles, doubles, and team events in the World Table Tennis Championships.

References

Chinese male table tennis players
1931 births
2007 deaths
Sportspeople from Yangzhou
Table tennis players from Jiangsu